Osvaldas Olisevičius (born January 10, 1993) is a professional Lithuanian basketball player for Reggio Emilia of the Italian Lega Basket Serie A (LBA). He can play both small forward and power forward positions.

Professional career
In 2014 Olisevičius was chosen as NKL Most Improved Player, while playing for Trakai and averaging 12.9 points, 4.4 rebounds and 1.6 assists. Next season he joined Pieno žvaigždės Pasvalys by signing a three-year deal. On June 10, 2017, Olisevičius signed with the German team s.Oliver Würzburg. On 3 January 2018, Olisevičius returned to Pieno žvaigždės Pasvalys.

In 2020, Olisevičius won the 2020 Karaliaus Mindaugo taurė Three-Point Contest, playing for Neptūnas Klaipėda. He averaged 10.1 points, 3.5 rebounds and 2.1 assists per game in the 2019-20 season. On August 12, 2020, Olisevičius signed with Medi Bayreuth of the Basketball Bundesliga.

On July 10, 2021, Olisevičius signed with Reggio Emilia of the Italian Lega Basket Serie A. On February 1, 2022, he extended his contract with the team until 2024.

International career
Olisevičius won silver medal while representing the Lithuanian U-16 National Team during the 2009 FIBA Europe Under-16 Championship.

References

1993 births
Living people
Basketball players from Vilnius
BC Neptūnas players
BC Pieno žvaigždės players
Lithuanian expatriate basketball people in Germany
Lithuanian men's basketball players
Medi Bayreuth players
Pallacanestro Reggiana players
Power forwards (basketball)
S.Oliver Würzburg players
Small forwards